Dacryopinax elegans is a species of jelly fungus in the family Dacrymycetaceae. It was originally formally described as Guepinia elegans by Miles Berkeley and Moses Ashley Curtis in 1849. George Willard Martin transferred it to the genus Dacryopinax in 1948.

References

Fungi described in 1849
Fungi of Asia
Fungi of Europe
Fungi of New Zealand
Fungi of North America
Taxa named by Miles Joseph Berkeley
Taxa named by Moses Ashley Curtis